Timothy Jay Simpson (born May 6, 1956) is an American professional golfer who has played on the PGA Tour and the Nationwide Tour, and currently plays on the Champions Tour.

Simpson was born and raised in Atlanta, Georgia. He attended high school at Woodward Academy where he was the Atlanta Junior Champion, Georgia Junior Champion and Westlake National Junior Champion. He attended the University of Georgia in Athens, Georgia, and was a member of the golf team. He left college early and turned professional at age 20. He earned his tour card at 21 years, 2 months.

Simpson's first win in professional golf came at the 1981 Cacharel World Under-25 Championship in Nimes, France. His first PGA Tour win came three seasons later at the 1985 Southern Open. His career year was 1989 when he captured the PGA Tour's Comeback Player of the Year award, and won two Tour events: the USF&G Classic and the Walt Disney World/Oldsmobile Classic. He had another good year in 1990: repeating as Walt Disney World/Oldsmobile Classic Champion, and posting his best finishes in the U.S. Open, British Open and PGA Championship. Simson was awarded the 1990 Georgia Professional Athlete of the Year award. He has 66 Top-10 finishes in PGA Tour events.

Simpson's PGA Tour career was brought to a sudden end due to his contracting Lyme disease on a hunting trip in 1991, and the neurological pathological condition resulting from it. He has had brain surgery and spinal fusion surgery. In his late thirties and forties, his health improved enough to allow him to play some on the Nationwide Tour. His best finishes in this venue were a 2nd at the 1995 NIKE Buffalo Open and a T-2 at the 1995 NIKE South Carolina Classic.

During his career Simpson was called one of the greatest ball strikers in the game's history by golfing greats Butch Harmon, Jack Nicklaus, and Johnny Miller.  Early in his career, he was mentored by long-time friends, Sam Snead and J. C. Snead.

Simpson was inducted into the Georgia Sports Hall of Fame in 2004, and the Georgia Golf Hall of Fame in 2006. He began play on the Champions Tour in 2006. He lives in Greensboro, Georgia with his wife Leigh Ann and their four children.

Amateur wins
1975 Palmetto Invitational College Tournament
1976 Southern Amateur

Professional wins (9)

PGA Tour wins (4)

PGA Tour playoff record (0–2)

Other wins (5)
1980 Georgia Open (tie with Bob Tway)
1981 Georgia Open, Cacharel World Under-25 Championship
1984 Georgia Open
1987 Georgia Open

Results in major championships

CUT = missed the half-way cut
"T" = tied

Summary

Most consecutive cuts made – 7 (1983 U.S. Open – 1985 U.S. Open)
Longest streak of top-10s – 1 (twice)

U.S. national team appearances
Four Tours World Championship: 1990

Filmography

Television

See also
Spring 1977 PGA Tour Qualifying School graduates
1993 PGA Tour Qualifying School graduates
1996 PGA Tour Qualifying School graduates

References

External links

American male golfers
Georgia Bulldogs men's golfers
PGA Tour golfers
PGA Tour Champions golfers
Golfers from Atlanta
Woodward Academy alumni
People from Greensboro, Georgia
1956 births
Living people